Aces Go Places 2 (Chinese: 最佳拍檔大顯神通) is a 1983 Hong Kong action-comedy film directed by Eric Tsang and starring Sam Hui, Karl Maka, Sylvia Chang. The film has also been dubbed into English and re-edited and was released overseas as Mad Mission II.

It is the second installment in the Aces Go Places film series.

Plot 
A James Bond-type burglar King Kong (Sam Hui) and his friend Albert "Baldy" Au (Karl Maka), a bald police detective join forces to try to track down a rare set of stolen precious diamonds before it ends up in the hands of a notorious European mobster named "Black Gloves" (Filthy Harry in the dubbed version and during the English-speaking parts of the original film). The two unlikely duo are supervised by Baldy's wife, Supt. Nancy Ho (Sylvia Chang), a masculine, fiery-tempered policewoman as they are chased by many mafia members throughout the film in crazy chase sequences involving a number of car and motorbike stunts.

Cast
Sam Hui as King Kong
Karl Maka as Albert Au
Sylvia Chang as Supt. Nancy Ho
Tsui Hark as Mental patient (special appearance)
Eric Tsang as Fattie (special appearance)
Raymond Wong as Priest (special appearance)
Yasuaki Kurata as Bull
Sue Wang as Juju
Joe Dimmick as Black Gloves
Hector Britt
Charlie Cho as Wong
Cho Tat-wah as Police Chief Uncle Wah
Billy Lau as Gunman
Suzanna Valentino
Jamie Hales as Stunt man in bicycle stunt sequence
Sai Gwa-Pau
Douglas Airth as Stunt man in car on two wheels sequence

Release
Aces Go Places was released in Hong Kong on 5 February 1983. The film was released in the Philippines by Valiant Films as Aces Strike to Win on 7 December 1988.

Reception
Variety described the film as a "well calculated commercial movie" and a "never a dull moment fun film for kids and adults with young minds attuned to things that are basic and elementary." The review stated that Sam Hui "is beginning to be an adept comedian with good timing though he still mugs a lot."

See also
Aces Go Places (film series)

Notes

References

External links

Review from HKCuk.co.uk

1983 films
1980s action comedy films
1983 martial arts films
1980s Cantonese-language films
Films directed by Eric Tsang
Films set in Hong Kong
Films shot in Hong Kong
Hong Kong heist films
Hong Kong action comedy films
Hong Kong martial arts comedy films
Hong Kong sequel films
Police detective films
Hong Kong slapstick comedy films
Hong Kong detective films
1983 comedy films
1980s Hong Kong films